Metasteridium is a genus of fungi within the Meliolaceae family.

References

Meliolaceae